Valda Joanne Hansen (November 3, 1932 – July 21, 1993) was an American actress, known for her performances in a number of B-movies in the 1950s and 1970s.

Her most famous role was that of the White Ghost in Ed Wood's Night of the Ghouls (1959). She had previously played a stripper in Strips Around the World (1955).

She returned to the screen in the 1970s and appeared in movies such as Cain's Cutthroats (1971), Slaughter's Big Rip-Off (1973) Norma (1970), The Great Northfield Minnesota Raid (1972) and Wham! Bam! Thank You, Spaceman! (1975).

She also appeared in a 1992 documentary about the filmmaker Ed Wood entitled Flying Saucers over Hollywood: The 'Plan 9' Companion, in which she said very nice things about the famed 1950s director. Valda, who believed deeply in astrology, said she and Wood shared a psychic link: "We were on this Earth, but not of it."

Career
Hansen first came across Ed Wood in 1957 at a local theater production called "Accidentally Yours". Impressed with what he saw, Wood asked her to think about a role in a short TV film he was making called "The Night the Banshee Cried", but he later put her in his 1958 film Night of the Ghouls instead. She accepted the role which was that of a ghost. He also got her to bleach her hair for the role. In 1964, Ed Wood wrote a proposed screenplay for a horror/comedy film to be called Attack of the Giant Salami, which was supposed to star Boris Karloff, Joe E. Brown and Valda Hansen, but the film was never made. Valda still remained a friend and admirer of Ed Wood for the remainder of her life, and always spoke highly of him.

She played the part of Sister Anne in the 1970 biker film, Outlaw Riders which was directed by Tony Huston, and a western called Cain's Cutthroats with Scott Brady and John Carradine. She played Mady Maguire's roommate in Norma (1970), a sexy drama co-starring Uschi Digard and Art Metrano.

In 1972, she appeared in The Great Northfield Minnesota Raid, starring Robert Duvall and Cliff Robertson. She also appeared in the 1973 film, Slaughter's Big Rip-Off which starred Jim Brown, Ed McMahon, Don Stroud and Brock Peters.

Later years
 
Hansen retired from acting around 1975 at age 43, and died in Hollywood on July 21, 1993, from cancer at age 60. The cancer started from a mole on her leg and spread rapidly. Due to her impoverished financial situation, she couldn't afford health insurance or the necessary medical treatments that might have saved her life.

Filmography

References

External links

1932 births
1993 deaths
20th-century American actresses
Actresses from Los Angeles
American film actresses
Deaths from cancer in California
People from Greater Los Angeles
Actresses from California